is the fifth studio album by Japanese band Wagakki Band. It was released on October 14, 2020 through Universal Sigma in six editions: a two-CD release with an instrumental disc, streaming, a first edition release with 144-page photo book, and three first edition releases with optional DVD or Blu-ray discs. In addition, a fan club exclusive  edition was released, featuring Mini Brokker figures of the eight members and a Blu-ray copy of the "WagakkiBand Japan Tour 2019 React -Shinshō- Final" concert at Yokosuka Arts Theater. The album features "Sakura Rising", a collaboration with Amy Lee of Evanescence.

The album peaked at No. 5 on Oricon's albums chart.

Track listing
All tracks are arranged by Wagakki Band.

Personnel 
 Yuko Suzuhana – vocals
 Machiya – guitar
 Beni Ninagawa – tsugaru shamisen
 Kiyoshi Ibukuro – koto
 Asa – bass
 Daisuke Kaminaga – shakuhachi
 Wasabi – drums
 Kurona – wadaiko

with

 Amy Lee – vocals (6)

Charts

References

External links 
  (Wagakki Band)
  (Universal Music Japan)
 
 

Wagakki Band albums
2020 albums
Japanese-language albums
Universal Sigma albums